The siege of Kurokawa Castle was a battle during the Azuchi–Momoyama period (16th century) of Japan. 
Following the assassination of Ashina Moritaka. Satake Yoshinobu, son of Satake Yoshishige, was chosen to inherit the leadership of the clan. 

Date Masamune, who had been a rival of the Ashina clan for many years, seized the chance to invade the territories of the Ashina. Masamune took the Kurokawa Castle with little effort.

Many vassals under the Ashina clan, inclusive of Inawashiro Morikuni, defected to the Date clan.

References

1589 in Japan
Kurokawa
Conflicts in 1589
Date clan